Améthyste is a nuclear-powered attack submarine of the French Navy, the fifth of the Rubis type. The boat's name is a pun on a precious stone (Amethyst) and the acronym AMElioration Tactique, HydrodYnamique, Silence, Transmission, Ecoute ("Tactical, hydrodynamics, silence and transmission improvements"). The boat is a major upgrade upon the initial design of the Rubis type, and earlier units have since been refitted to meet her standards.

Service history

Améthyste took part in Operation Allied Force, the 1999 bombing campaign over Yugoslavia, by protecting the NATO aeronaval group. The boat also gathered information for the coalition.

The submarine Améthyste was part of the French naval task group led by the aircraft carrier  that departed Toulon on 30 October 2010 for a four-month deployment to the Mediterranean Sea, Red Sea, Indian Ocean and Persian Gulf.  The task group commander, Rear Admiral Jean-Louis Kerignard, defined force's mission as follows:

"The force would help allied navies fight piracy off the coast of Somalia and send jets to support NATO in the skies above Afghanistan."

Once on station, the Charles de Gaulle carrier task group joined two U.S. Navy carrier strike groups led by the s  and  operating in the Persian Gulf. Subsequently, between 7–14 January 2011, the French carrier task group led by Charles de Gaulle participated with bilateral naval exercise, code named Varuna 10, with the Indian Navy. Varuna 10 was a two-phase naval exercise, with the harbor phase taking place between 7–11 January and the sea phase between 11 and 14 January in the Arabian Sea.

In December 2022, the submarine was reported operating in the Atlantic and paid a rare visit to the Clyde naval base in Scotland.

Decorations 
The fanion of Améthyste is decorated:

 Croix de guerre des théâtres d'opérations extérieures with 1 bronze star;
 Cross for Military Valour with 1 palm.

Notes and references 

Submarines of France
Rubis-class submarines
Ships built in France
1988 ships